Eddie Fitzgerald (February 18, 1888 – March 7, 1936) was an American long-distance runner. He competed in the men's 5000 metres at the 1912 Summer Olympics.

References

External links
 

1888 births
1936 deaths
Athletes (track and field) at the 1912 Summer Olympics
American male long-distance runners
Olympic track and field athletes of the United States
Place of birth missing
20th-century American people